Parliamentary elections were held in Greece on 16 April 1895. Supporters of Theodoros Deligiannis emerged as the largest bloc in Parliament, with 150 of the 207 seats. Deligiannis became Prime Minister for the third time on 11 June 1895.

Results

References

Greece
Parliamentary elections in Greece
1895 in Greece
Greece
1890s in Greek politics